Kaukola Ridge at Sunset is a painting by Finnish painter Albert Edelfelt completed in 1890. The painting is considered part of the Golden Age of Finnish Art.

The painting depicts the view of a mirror-like lake at sunset in Finland. In the foreground are some young pines and a half-uprooted stump. In the middle is a bay with wooded islets. To the left, a ridge runs diagonally across the picture.

Albert Edelfelt painted the picture from June to July 1889  in Tammela, Tavastia at Saaris estate - owned by the family of his wife, .

The painting is on display at Ateneum in Helsinki, Finland.

References 

1890 paintings
Paintings by Albert Edelfelt
Paintings in the collection of the Ateneum